Touch Kim Sy (born 13 August 1940) is a Cambodian sailor. He competed in the Finn event at the 1964 Summer Olympics.

References

External links
 

1940 births
Living people
Cambodian male sailors (sport)
Olympic sailors of Cambodia
Sailors at the 1964 Summer Olympics – Finn
Place of birth missing (living people)